Gora Veternička  is a village in Croatia. The village was ranked #6 in the list of "Best Places to Live In in Croatia" in 2003. According to the 2001 census, the village has 283 inhabitants and 86 family households.

References

Populated places in Krapina-Zagorje County